The Sir John Nelthorpe School is a secondary school and sixth form on Grammar School Road and  Wrawby Road in Brigg, North Lincolnshire, England. The present school was established in 1976, and has a timeline through earlier schools to that established by Sir John Nelthorpe in 1669.

History

Grammar school

The school, also referred to as SJN, was formed as a grammar school in 1669 by Sir John Nelthorpe, who was born in Brigg in 1614. He was unmarried and wanted his wealth from his estate across Lincolnshire to create a school in his name. The buildings were opened around 1680, and the Upper School Library dates from this time. New buildings were added in 1879, and the Nelthorpe family have retained strong links with the school.

The grammar school in the 1970s had around 350 boys. Brigg Girls' High School, on Wrawby Road, had around 250 girls, and became the lower school. These schools were administered until 1974 by the Lindsey Education Committee, based in Lincoln.

Comprehensive
The school became a co-educational comprehensive in 1976.

Building improvements have included a new canteen, refurbishment of the drama hall and science labs, redecoration of English classrooms and improved security. The school was one of two in Humberside LEA that had a boarding house; Bridlington School (a former grammar school) was the other. Since 1996 it has been administered by North Lincolnshire; the LEA's offices are also in Brigg.

Curriculum
The school shares the sixth form, known as the Brigg Sixth Form, with the town's other comprehensive school, The Vale Academy. This allows pupils a wider range of subjects. 'A' level results have traditionally been high, with many subjects placed in the national top 25%.
School expeditions were made to Malawi in 2012, and India in 2014. The school took part in a Great War research project supported by the Heritage Lottery Fund. Its pupils are currently district netball and cricket champions and winners of the Magistrates Mock Trial competition.

Awards and recognition
In 2014 Ofsted rated the school Grade 2 "Good" for overall effectiveness, following a 2013 report of Grade 3 "Requires Improvement", and 2011, 2009 and 2006 of Grade 3 "Satisfactory".

In recent years GCSE results have been consistent at over 70% A*-C. In 2015, 74% of students achieved 5 grades A* to C including English and maths, and 46% achieved the Ebacc, both figures the highest in North Lincolnshire.

Admissions
The school is for ages from 11 to 18. The Lower School is on Wrawby Road.

Partner schools
Since 1996, it has had a partnership with the Gymnasium Leoninum in Handrup, Lower Saxony (Niedersachsen) in Germany.

Notable alumni

Brigg Grammar School
 William Eric Grasar (1924–31), Roman Catholic Bishop of Shrewsbury 1962-80
 Robert Hudson (1934–41), Professor of Organic Chemistry from 1967–85 at the University of Kent
 Eric Waldram Kemp (1926–33), Bishop of Chichester 1974-2001
 Kenneth Jones (1932-9), High Court Judge (died 2004), who prosecuted the Kray Twins
 John Pimlott (1959–66), military historian
 Alexander Trees, Baron Trees, Professor of veterinary parasitology and Crossbench member of the House of Lords

Sir John Nelthorpe School
 Duncan Heath, first-class cricketer
 John Heath, first-class cricketer
 John Osbourne, writer and broadcaster
 Matt Sparrow, footballer
 David Yelland, former editor of The Sun from 1998–2003, from 1976 to 1981.
 Holly Mumby-Croft, British Conservative Party politician, serving as the Member of Parliament (MP) for Scunthorpe (2019-)

Brigg Girls' High School
 Sylvia Jackson (1958–65), Labour MSP for Stirling from 1999-2007
 Carmel McCourt, singer

References

External links
 School website
 Making multimedia in ICT
 Old Briggensians
 2007 School Prom photo gallery taken at Elsham Hall

Video clips
 The House That John Built - Brigg Grammar School 1960s
 The Racket - Brigg Grammar School 1960s

Secondary schools in the Borough of North Lincolnshire
1669 establishments in England
Educational institutions established in the 1660s
Brigg
Voluntary controlled schools in England